The 2011–12 NCAA Division I men's basketball season began on November 7, 2011 with the (2K Sports Classic) and ended with the 2012 NCAA Division I men's basketball tournament's championship game on April 2, 2012 at the Mercedes-Benz Superdome in New Orleans. The tournament began with four first-round games on March 13–14, 2012 in Dayton, Ohio, US, followed by second and third rounds on Thursday through Sunday, March 15–18, 2012. Regionals games were played on Thursday through Sunday, March 22–25, 2012, with the Final Four played on Saturday and Monday, March 31 and April 2, 2012.

Kentucky claimed its eighth NCAA title, defeating Kansas 67–59 in the final. Consensus national player of the year Anthony Davis of Kentucky was named Most Outstanding Player of the tournament.

Season headlines
September 13 – NCAA recruiting frenzy resumed when high school junior Jabari Parker held an open practice attended by representatives of 42 NCAA Division I schools, including Mike Krzyzewski, Roy Williams, Tom Izzo, Bruce Weber, Billy Kennedy, Thad Matta, Bill Self, Oliver Purnell and Larry Krystkowiak.
November 1 – The AP preseason All-American team was named. Ohio State's Jared Sullinger was the only unanimous pick. Joining Sullinger were North Carolina forward Harrison Barnes (63 of 65 possible votes), Wisconsin guard Jordan Taylor (51), Kentucky forward Terrence Jones (33) and Connecticut guard Jeremy Lamb (25).
After Tennessee head coach Bruce Pearl was fired following the 2010–11 season for major recruiting violations, he took a job as vice president of marketing with a Knoxville-based wholesale grocery company, H.T. Hackney. He had been offered an opportunity to coach the NBA Development League's Texas Legends but declined because he wanted to stay in the Knoxville area with his family.
November 11 – the game between Michigan State and #1 North Carolina, known as the inaugural Carrier Classic, was played on the deck of the USS Carl Vinson off the coast of Coronado, California on Veterans Day. It was the first ever college basketball game played on a Navy aircraft carrier. President Barack Obama and Michelle Obama attended the game as North Carolina won 67–55.
November 17 – Syracuse associate head coach Bernie Fine was placed on paid administrative leave after accusations by multiple former ball boys claimed that he sexually molested them a number of times spanning more than 10 years. The story about Fine broke less than two weeks after the Penn State sex abuse scandal came to light. Fine was subsequently fired on November 27, ending his streak as Division I's longest-tenured assistant coach at one school.
December 5 – Harvard became ranked in the AP Poll for the first time in school history, coming in at No. 25 after an 8–0 start. It leaves Brown as the only remaining Ivy League school to have never been ranked in the poll and leaves only seven schools that have played Division I basketball since the AP Poll began that have never been ranked in it.
December 5 – Mike Krzyzewski and Tennessee Lady Volunteers coach Pat Summitt were named the co-recipients of the annual Sports Illustrated Sportsman of the Year award, making them the third and fourth college basketball coaches selected in its 57-year history.
December 28 – After beating (15 AP/14 Coaches) Mississippi State, the Baylor Bears had their program's first ever 13–0 start and a school-record tying 13-game winning streak. The Bears' record reached 17–0 before finally losing to No. 7 Kansas, 92–74, on January 16. At the time of their first loss they were ranked No. 3 in the nation, another all-time program high.
December 31 – No. 13 Indiana defeats No. 2 Ohio State, becoming the first Hoosiers men's basketball team to defeat both the No. 1 and No. 2 ranked teams in the same season (they had also previously upset then-#1 Kentucky, 73–72).
January 5 – A Sun Belt Conference game between Louisiana–Lafayette and Western Kentucky ends in controversy, as officials failed to notice that the Ragin' Cajuns had six men on the court when Elfrid Payton drove for the layup that gave them a 72–70 win on WKU's home court. The conference's coordinator of officials stated that the error was not correctable post-game, but indicated that suspensions of the three officials involved were possible.
February 9 – Murray State, the last unbeaten team in Division I men's basketball and ranked No. 9 in the country, loses at home to Tennessee State 72–68.
February 21 – Binghamton becomes the last team in Division I to win a game. They started 0–26 until a 57–53 upset win over Vermont.
February 24 – Radford receives two years of probation, but no postseason ban, for providing impermissible benefits to recruits. Former head coach Brad Greenberg, who left after the 2010–11 season, is hit with a five-year show-cause penalty for leading an effort to mislead NCAA investigators.
March 8 – Yahoo! Sports reports that the FBI is investigating suspended Auburn point guard Varez Ward for possible involvement in a point shaving scheme. A second Auburn player had been investigated, but was cleared.

Milestones and records
November 11 – Louisville coach Rick Pitino recorded his 600th career win in an 83–48 victory over Tennessee–Martin. He became the 15th fastest coach to do so (38th overall).
November 15 – Duke coach Mike Krzyzewski recorded his 903rd win as a head coach, surpassing his former college coach Bob Knight for the most in Division I men's basketball history. The #6 Blue Devils defeated Michigan State, 74–69, at Madison Square Garden.
November 20 – Connecticut point guard Shabazz Napier recorded the ninth triple-double in school history. He compiled 22 points, 13 assists and 12 rebounds in an 87–70 win over Coppin State.
November 22 – Tennessee forward Jeronne Maymon scored 32 points and grabbed a Maui Invitational Tournament-record 20 rebounds in a double-overtime loss to #8 Memphis, 99–97.
November 28 – Florida coach Billy Donovan recorded his 400th career win in a 96–70 defeat of Stetson.
December 3 – Ohio State coach Thad Matta recorded his 300th career win in a 64–35 defeat of Texas–Pan American.
December 10 – IUPUI player Alex Young scored a team record 43 points in an 84–76 win over Western Kentucky.
December 30 – Coppin State coach Fang Mitchell recorded his 400th win at the school in a 93–83 defeat of Nebraska-Omaha.
January 4 – Zack Rosen became Penn's all-time assist leader, passing his coach Jerome Allen's mark of 505. Rosen finished his career with 588 assists.
January 10 – Illinois guard Brandon Paul scored 43 points in a 79–74 upset over No. 5 Ohio State. The 43 points was the third-highest scoring game in Illinois history and his eight three-pointers tied a school record.
Guard Alex Young of IUPUI, UC Santa Barbara guard Orlando Johnson, High Point guard Nick Barbour, Oral Roberts forward Dominique Morrison, Oakland guard Reggie Hamilton, Tennessee Tech guard Kevin Murphy, Lehigh guard CJ McCollum, St. Bonaventure forward Andrew Nicholson and Northwestern forward John Shurna each passed the 2,000 point mark for their careers.
January 17 – Western Carolina defeated Toccoa Falls College (a member of the National Christian College Athletic Association) by a score of 141–39, making the 102-point win margin the third largest in NCAA Division I men's basketball history. It also set WCU program records for points in a game and points in a half (72; first half). Nine players scored in double figures for the Catamounts.
January 28 – Towson defeated UNC Wilmington 66–61, ending the longest losing streak in Division I men's basketball history at 41 games.
January 30 – Tennessee Tech guard Kevin Murphy scored 50 points against SIU Edwardsville, breaking the previous school record of 38.
February 18 – Iona point guard Scott Machado set the Metro Atlantic Athletic Conference record for single-season and career assists in a Bracket Buster game against Nevada Machado finished the season with 327 assists and tallied 880 for his career.
February 29 – North Carolina point guard Kendall Marshall broke Ed Cota's school single-season assist record (284) in a win over Maryland On March 9 in an ACC tournament game against NC State, Marshall eclipsed Craig Neal's ACC single season assist mark of 303. Marshall finished the season with 351 assists.
Missouri's Ricardo Ratliffe set the Missouri and Big 12 Conference single season record for field goal percentage. Ratliffe shot 69.3% from the floor, also leading the country in this category.
March 16 – In the NCAA tournament's Round of 64, Michigan State's Draymond Green recorded a triple-double with 24 points, 12 rebounds and 10 assists. Green also had recorded a triple-double in a 2011 tournament game, making him one of only three players in history to record multiple triple-doubles in its history, and the only one officially recognized by the NCAA to have accomplished this feat. The others were Hall of Famers Oscar Robertson (4) and Magic Johnson (2).
April 2 – By winning the national championship game, Kentucky records its 38th win, setting a new all-time single season record for a men's Division I basketball program.
April 2 – Jeff Withey of Kansas broke Joakim Noah's NCAA tournament blocked shot record of 29, set in 2006. Withey finished with 31 blocks in the 2012 NCAA tournament. Kentucky's Anthony Davis also tied Noah's record.

Conference membership changes

The 2011–12 season saw the first wave of membership changes resulting from a major realignment of NCAA Division I conferences. The cycle began in 2010 with the Big Ten and the then-Pac-10 publicly announcing their intentions to expand. The fallout from these conferences' moves later affected a majority of D-I conferences.

New arenas
Bowling Green, which had played since 1960 at the on-campus Anderson Arena, opened the Stroh Center, also on campus. In the first regular-season game in the new arena, the Falcons defeated Howard 63–48 on November 11.
Evansville moved from Roberts Municipal Stadium, their home since 1956, to the new Ford Center in downtown Evansville. The Purple Aces also won their first regular-season game in the new building, defeating Butler 80–77 in overtime on November 12. (Incidentally, this was Butler's second consecutive season as the first regular-season opponent in a new facility; the 2010–11 team christened Louisville's new KFC Yum! Center.)
Omaha made its Division I debut in the new Ralston Arena, an off-campus venue in Ralston, a suburb of Omaha. The team's former on-campus home, Lee & Helene Sapp Fieldhouse, remained in use by the Omaha women's team. (Both teams would move in 2015 to the on-campus Baxter Arena.)
UNC Asheville, like Bowling Green, moved from one on-campus facility to another, leaving behind their home since 1963, the Justice Center, for the new Kimmel Arena. The Bulldogs brought in top-ranked North Carolina for the arena's regular-season opening on November 13. The Tar Heels, playing in head coach Roy Williams' hometown, won 91–75. (UNC Asheville was also christening a new arena for the second consecutive season; the 2010–11 team defeated Auburn in the first regular-season game at the Tigers' new Auburn Arena.)
UT Arlington moved in midseason. The Mavericks started the season at Texas Hall, which opened in 1965 when the team was known as the Arlington State Rebels. On February 1, the Mavericks opened College Park Center, located on the opposite side of their campus, defeating UTSA 67–66.

Major rule changes
Beginning in 2011–12, the following rules change was implemented:
The charge circle was instituted – a semi-circle in front of the basket. Secondary defenders must be outside of this circle to effectively draw a charge. Otherwise they will be assessed an automatic blocking foul.

Season outlook

Pre-season polls

The top 25 from the AP and ESPN/USA Today Coaches Polls.

Regular season
A number of early-season tournaments marked the beginning of the college basketball season.

Early-season tournaments
 

*Although these tournaments include more teams, only the number listed play for the championship.

Conference winners and tournaments
Thirty athletic conferences each end their regular seasons with a single-elimination tournament. The teams in each conference that win their regular season title are given the number one seed in each tournament. The winners of these tournaments receive automatic invitations to the 2012 NCAA Division I men's basketball tournament. The Ivy League does not have a conference tournament, instead giving their automatic invitation to their regular-season champion. As of 2012, the Great West Conference does not have an automatic bid to the NCAA Men or Women's College Tournament but the men's tourney champion does receive an automatic bid to the CollegeInsider.com Postseason Tournament

Statistical leaders

Conference standings

Postseason tournaments

NCAA tournament

Final Four – Louisiana Superdome, New Orleans, Louisiana

Tournament upsets
For this list, a "major upset" is defined as a win by a team seeded 7 or more spots below its defeated opponent.

National Invitation tournament

After the NCAA Tournament field was announced, the NCAA invited 32 teams to participate in the National Invitation Tournament. The tournament began on March 13, with all games prior to the semifinals played on campus sites. The semifinals and final were respectively held on March 27 and 29 at the traditional site of Madison Square Garden.

NIT Semifinals and Final
Played at Madison Square Garden in New York City

College Basketball Invitational

The fifth College Basketball Invitational (CBI) Tournament was held beginning March 13 and ended with a best-of-three final, which went to the maximum number of games and ended on March 30.

CollegeInsider.com Postseason tournament

The fourth CollegeInsider.com Postseason Tournament was held beginning March 15 and ended with a championship game on March 28. This tournament places an emphasis on selecting successful teams from "mid-major" conferences who were left out of the NCAA Tournament and NIT.

Award winners

Consensus All-American teams

The following players are recognized as the 2012 Consensus All-Americans:

Major player of the year awards
Wooden Award: Anthony Davis, Kentucky
Naismith Award: Anthony Davis, Kentucky
Associated Press Player of the Year: Anthony Davis, Kentucky
NABC Player of the Year: Draymond Green, Michigan State
Oscar Robertson Trophy (USBWA): Anthony Davis, Kentucky 
Adolph Rupp Trophy: Anthony Davis, Kentucky
Sporting News Player of the Year: Anthony Davis, Kentucky

Major freshman of the year awards
Wayman Tisdale Award (USBWA): Anthony Davis, Kentucky
Sporting News Freshman of the Year: Anthony Davis, Kentucky

Major coach of the year awards
Associated Press Coach of the Year: Frank Haith, Missouri
Henry Iba Award (USBWA): Frank Haith, Missouri
NABC Coach of the Year: Tom Izzo, Michigan State
Naismith College Coach of the Year: Bill Self, Kansas
 Adolph Rupp Cup: Bill Self, Kansas
 Sporting News Coach of the Year: Bill Self, Kansas

Other major awards
Bob Cousy Award (Best point guard): Kendall Marshall, North Carolina
Pete Newell Big Man Award (Best big man): Anthony Davis, Kentucky
NABC Defensive Player of the Year: Anthony Davis, Kentucky
Frances Pomeroy Naismith Award (Best senior 6'0"/1.83 m or shorter): Reggie Hamilton, Oakland
Lowe's Senior CLASS Award (top senior): Robbie Hummel, Purdue
Robert V. Geasey Trophy (Top player in Philadelphia Big 5): Zack Rosen, Penn
NIT/Haggerty Award (Top player in New York City metro area): Scott Machado, Iona
Ben Jobe Award (Top minority coach): Sean Woods, Mississippi Valley State
Hugh Durham Award (Top mid-major coach): Eddie Payne, USC Upstate
Jim Phelan Award (Top head coach): Mike Brey, Notre Dame
Lefty Driesell Award (Top defensive player): Anthony Davis, Kentucky
Lou Henson Award (Top mid-major player): Kyle O'Quinn, Norfolk State
Lute Olson Award (Top non-freshman or transfer player): Doug McDermott, Creighton
Skip Prosser Man of the Year Award (Coach with moral character): Jimmy Patsos, Loyola (MD)
Academic All-American of the Year (Top scholar-athlete): Tyler Zeller, North Carolina
Elite 89 Award (Top GPA at Final Four): Aaron Craft, Ohio State

Coaching changes
A number of teams changed coaches during and after the season.

References